Elections were held in the Regional Municipality of Halton of Ontario on October 27, 2014 in conjunction with municipal elections across the province.

Halton Regional Council

Burlington

Halton Hills

Milton

Oakville

References 

Halton
Regional Municipality of Halton